Spialia paula, the mite sandman, is a butterfly of the family Hesperiidae.

This is a small butterfly that is primarily brown with white spots on the dorsal side of the wings. Adults are on wing between August and April. Adults of both sexes feed from flowers.

References

External links
 
 

butterflies described in 1925
Spialia